Pingtang County is a county in the Qiannan Buyei and Miao Autonomous Prefecture of Guizhou province, China, bordering Guangxi to the south. It is a high mountain valley and is inhabited mainly by members of the Buyei and Miao ethnic minorities, who together make up 55% of the county's population.

The county's area is 2,799.08 square km and at the 2010 Census its population was 228,560. The county's government is based in the town of Pinghu.

The Five Hundred Meter Aperture Spherical Telescope (FAST) is located in the southwestern part of Pingtan County, near its Kedu and Tangbian Towns and Dongjia Township of the adjacent Luodian County.

Administrative divisions
The towns and townships under the jurisdiction of Pingtang County include:

Towns
Pinghu
Bairu
Tongzhou
Yazhou
Datang
Kedu
Tangbian
Zhemi
Sizhai

Townships
Bailong
Xintang
Kapu Maonan Ethnic Township
Xiliang
Kaluo
Gudong
Zhangbu
Shuchang
Ganzhai
Miao'erhe

Curiosities

In June 2002, Chinese researchers announced the discovery of a 270-million-year-old stone called Hidden character stone inscribed with six Chinese characters, reading "" ("the Communist Party of China Perish") at the Zhangbu Scenic Spot in Zhangbu village.

Climate

References

External links
Map of Pingtang County

County-level divisions of Guizhou
Qiannan Buyei and Miao Autonomous Prefecture